Tamra (or ) is an Arab village in north-eastern Israel. Located in the Jezreel Valley, it falls under the jurisdiction of Gilboa Regional Council.

Etymology
The name Tamra is derived from the Arabic to make a pit for storing corn & c.

History
Remains from the  Iron Age I era have been excavated.   Remains from  the Iron Age II,   the Late Persian – Early Hellenistic, Roman and  Byzantine eras have been found here.

A village was here in the Byzantine period; tombs and remnants of two churches have been found.  In the Byzantine and early Islamic eras, there was an agricultural settlement here.

Remains from  the Early Islamic  (Umayyad/Abbasid) (including  Umayyad glass vessels and Abbasid pottery and a lamp) have also been found.

Remains dating to the Umayyad era (seventh–eighth centuries CE) have been excavated, together with  housing remains dating to the Early Abbasid period  (late eighth and early ninth centuries CE).

A Basilica was constructed here during the Umayyad  era, a dedication from 725 CE was found in the middle. Mosaics belonging to the church have been excavated. The church was probably damaged in the 749 Galilee earthquake, after which its columns were replaced with square pilasters. The archeological evidence indicates that a thriving Christian community existed here in the Umayyad and the Abbasid eras.  Two complex winepress that were operated in the Umayyad and Abbasid periods have also been found, indicating widespread wine production during these eras.

Mamluk era remains have also been found.

Ottoman era
During the Ottoman era, a map by Pierre Jacotin  from Napoleon's invasion of 1799 noted the place, as a village.

In 1875, the French explorer Victor Guérin visited Tamra and found it to be a village of about 120 inhabitants, living in adobe houses, or houses built of volcanic materials. He further  noted:
This village  has taken the place of an ancient town which formerly rose in an amphitheatre around an abundant spring, whose waters are received in a regular basin formerly vaulted. Everywhere considerable piles of stones, for the most part basaltic;	the remains of overthrown houses strew the slopes of the hill. In the midst of these confused ruins I remarked, near the spring, the vestiges of a small church lying east and west and divided into three naves. It was ornamented with columns, of which several trunks yet remain.	In the higher part of the city are still distinguished the remains of a second church, almost entirely destroyed, which was paved with mosaic, as is proven by the little cubes lying about on the ground.

In 1882, the  PEF's Survey of Western Palestine (SWP) described Tumrah as "a village of middling size,  perhaps  50 or 70 houses, situated on high ground, and surrounded by plough-land." They also noted that there were ruins on the south side of the village.

British Mandate era
In the 1922 census of Palestine conducted by the British Mandate authorities, Thamra  showed a population of 104, all Muslims, increasing in the 1931 census to 193, still all  Muslims,  in  a total of 34  houses. 

In the 1945 statistics Tamra had 240 inhabitants, 160 Arabs and 80 Jews,  with a total of  9,436 dunams of land, according to an official land and population survey. Of this, 27 dunams were  plantations and irrigable land,  9,090 dunams were used for cereals, while 6 dunams were built-up land.

State of Israel
Since 1948 Tamra has been under Israeli rule.

See also
Arab localities in Israel

References

Bibliography

  
  (p. 734)

External links
Welcome To Tamra 
Survey of Western Palestine, Map 9:     IAA, Wikimedia commons

Arab villages in Israel
Populated places in Northern District (Israel)